Bang Khun Non station, is an elevated railway station on MRT Blue Line. The station opened on 23 December 2019. The station is one of the nine stations of phase 3 of MRT Blue Line.

The station is located southward of Bang Khun Nont Junction in the three areas of Bangkok Noi District: Bang Khun Non, Bang Khun Si and Ban Chang Lo above Charan Sanitwong Road, where Charan Sanitwong cuts across Sutthawat Roads and Southern Railway Line from nearby Thon Buri railway station, and it has a connection to the State Railway of Thailand Southern Railway Line at Charansanitwong Halt.

In addition, the station also has another feature: there is a viaduct crosses over the tracks from side to side, over the platforms. It was created to bring the Buddha's relics to the other side at the Chak Phra Festival held annually during the month of November, a local traditional festival in Thonburi area, since Buddha's relics are sacred objects therefore does not pass under any bridge or road at all. Only this station and Bang Phai station are unique.

References 

MRT (Bangkok) stations